The Oakland Golden Grizzlies are the men's basketball team that represent Oakland University in Rochester, Michigan, United States. The school's team competes in the Horizon League and plays their home games at the Athletics Center O'rena. The Golden Grizzlies are coached by Greg Kampe. Kampe is the second longest-tenured Division I head coach, behind Jim Boeheim. Oakland last played in the NCAA Division I men's basketball tournament in 2011.

Through December 29, 2020, Oakland has made a three-point field goal in 1,014 consecutive games, the fifth-longest active NCAA Division I streak. They last finished a game without a three-pointer on January 30, 1988.

History
The Oakland men's basketball program began competing in the 1967 season, 10 years after the university opened. Originally nicknamed the Pioneers, they won their first NCAA game 109–106 in overtime against Albion. The Pioneers were without a conference until 1974 when they joined the Great Lakes Intercollegiate Athletic Conference (GLIAC).

The first year as members of the GLIAC, Oakland hired Greg Kampe, who is still the head coach at the university. Kampe has the fifth-longest tenure of all active Division I coaches. Oakland won two regular season GLIAC championships, in 1995–96 and 1996–97, their final two seasons in the league. In a 1993 game against Madonna, Oakland scored 91 points in the first half, on their way to a 189–107 victory. That game set school records for most points in a half (98) and largest margin of victory (82). The next three seasons, OU scored more than 100 points 30 times, winning 29 of those games.

Oakland played at the Division II level until 1997 when they changed their nickname to the Golden Grizzlies and began the transition to Division I. OU opened the Athletics Center O'rena in 1998 against Michigan State. When the O'rena was being built, home basketball games were played in the Sports Dome, an inflatable "bubble" used for practice by Oakland's athletic teams during the winter. The original basketball stadium was in the Hollie L. Lepley Sports Center.

The Golden Grizzlies completed the transition to Division I in 1999 and joined the Mid-Continent Conference (now known as The Summit League).

The Golden Grizzlies joined the Horizon League starting in the 2013–14 season.

Postseason history
Oakland competed in NCAA Division II since the inception of the basketball program in 1967 until they moved to NCAA Division I in 1997. The Golden Grizzlies reached the Division II postseason four times in their final four seasons at that level.

NCAA Division I Tournament results
The Golden Grizzlies have appeared in three Division I NCAA Tournaments. Their overall record is 1–3.

NCAA Division II Tournament results
The Golden Grizzlies have appeared in four Division II NCAA Tournaments. Their overall record is 3–5.

NIT results
The Golden Grizzlies have appeared in one National Invitation Tournament. Their overall record is 1–1.

Vegas 16 results
The Golden Grizzlies participated in the first and only Vegas 16. Their record was 2–1.

CIT results
The Golden Grizzlies have appeared in Four CollegeInsider.com Postseason Tournaments (CIT). Their overall record is 4–4.

All-time win–loss record
Through 2020–21 season

Records

Media
OU men's basketball games are broadcast on WDFN (1130 AM). The play-by-play commentator is Neal Ruhl, with former Oakland and professional player, Dan Waterstradt. Oakland home games are simulcast on ESPN3, WMYD and WDFN.

Mario Impemba, also the play-by-play commentator for the Detroit Tigers on Fox Sports Detroit, broadcast Oakland games from 2006–2013.

Oakland players who played in the NBA
Keith Benson
Jamal Cain
Kay Felder
Rawle Marshall
Kendrick Nunn

Footnotes
 The official Oakland record book lists Reggie Hamilton in third place with 548 career assists from 2010–2012. That includes the assists he accumulated while at UMKC from 2007–2009, which is inconsistent with how the rest of the record book handles transfer player statistics.
 The official Oakland record book lists Marshall's total at 199, but the addition of his individual season's statistics makes the total 198 (80 in 2002–03, 59 in 2003–04, 59 in 2004–05).
 There is a discrepancy between sources for Brock's 2016–17 season block total. The official Oakland record book lists 72, while other sources list the total as 69. This is due to a difference in total blocks for the December 10, 2016, game against Robert Morris. Both school box scores list 7 blocks while ESPN and sports-reference.com list 5.

References

External links